David P. O'Brien  is a Canadian businessman, currently as chairman of Royal Bank of Canada.

Education
O'Brien obtained a Bachelor of Arts with Honours in Economics from Concordia University and a Bachelor of Civil Law (1965) from McGill University. At McGill he was selected as the Articles Editor for the McGill Law Journal.

Career
In addition to his current role as chairman of Royal Bank of Canada, O'Brien is a board member at Enerplus, Range Royalty, and Spur Resources and has previously served as a director at Molson Coors Brewing Company, TransCanada Corporation, Fairmont Hotels and Resorts, Inco Limited and the C. D. Howe Institute. 

From 1995 to 2002, he was President and CEO of Canadian Pacific Railways Limited.

In May 2004, O’Brien was inducted into the Canadian Business Hall of Fame. 

In 2005, he endowed the O'Brien Fellowships in the Centre for Human Rights and Legal Pluralism at McGill University's Faculty of Law.

He also served as the chancellor of Concordia University in Montreal, Quebec, from January 1, 2006 to December 31, 2010. 

In January 2009, O'Brien was named an officer of the Order of Canada "for his contributions as a respected corporate leader, and his support for post-secondary education across Canada".

Personal life
He currently resides in Calgary, Alberta.

References

Businesspeople from Calgary
Businesspeople from Montreal
Officers of the Order of Canada
Directors of Royal Bank of Canada
Chancellors of Concordia University
Anglophone Quebec people
Year of birth missing (living people)
Living people
Canadian chairpersons of corporations
McGill University Faculty of Law alumni